is a wagashi (Japanese confection) made from warabiko (bracken starch) and covered or dipped in kinako (sweet toasted soybean flour). It differs from true mochi made from glutinous rice. It is popular in the summertime, especially in the Kansai region and Okinawa, and often sold from trucks, similar to an ice cream truck in Western countries.

Warabimochi was one of the favorite treats of Emperor Daigo.

Today, warabimochi is frequently made with katakuriko (potato starch) instead of bracken starch due to cost and availability. Kuromitsu syrup is sometimes poured on top before serving as an added sweetener.

See also
Bracken

References

External links
 
 Warabimochi
 Homemade Warabimochi

Wagashi
Starch